Zar may refer to:

Places 
 Zar, Armenia
 Zar, Azerbaijan
 Žár, Czech Republic
 Zar, Iran, in Markazi Province
 Zeraq, or Zar, Hamadan Province, Iran
 Żar, Łódź Voivodeship, Poland
 Żar (mountain), in Poland
 Žar Mountain, a mountain range in Kosovo
 South African Republic

People

Surname
Chet Zar (born 1967), American artist; son of James Zar
Heather Zar (born ?), South African pediatrician, respiratory specialist, writer, and professor
Ibn Abi Zar (died between 1310 and 1320), Moroccan historian and poet; presumed author of the medieval history of Morocco, Rawd al-Qirtas
James Zar (1941–2015), American artist; father of Chet Zar
Jerrold Zar (born 1941), American biologist and professor
Lwi Zar (born 1976), Burmese politician
Mordechai Zar (1914–1982), Israeli politician
Moshe Zar (born 1938), Israeli settlement leader and religious Zionist
Paul Zar (born 1967), American bobsledder and Olympic competitor
Pe Thein Zar (1943–2018), Burmese-born Australian student leader, lawyer, revolutionary and freedom fighter, and writer
Rose Zar (1922–2001), a Polish Holocaust survivor, human rights activist, and author
Sarah Zar (born ?), American visual and performance artist, musician, songwriter, and writer

Given name
Zar Wali Khan (born 1953), Pakistani Islamic scholar
Zar Gul Khan (fl. 2017), Pakistani politician
Zar Lawrence (born 1982), New Zealand rugby player
Zar Randeri (pen name of Bharucha Hasim bin Yusuf; 1887–?), Indian Gujarati poet and translator
Zar Zar Myint (born 1993), Burmese footballer 
Zar Zari Zar Baksh ( AD 1400), Indian Sufi saint
Zarsanga (or Zar Sanga, born 1946), Pakistani Pashto folk singer

Other uses 
 Zār, or Zaar, a demon or spirit in the Horn of Africa and adjacent regions of the Middle East
 Zar, a band featuring John Lawton
 Zar, a fictional land in "The White Ship" by H. P. Lovecraft
 Zar Points, a statistical method for evaluating hands in contract bridge
 Rincón Zapotec, a language of Mexico, ISO 639-3 code zar
 South African rand, the currency of South Africa, ISO 4217 code ZAR

See also 

 Zaar (disambiguation)
 Żar (disambiguation)
 Tsar (disambiguation)
 Zar und Zimmermann, a comic opera